William D. Chapple (August 6, 1868 – May 3, 1956) was a Massachusetts lawyer and politician who served as President of the Massachusetts Senate.

Early life and education
Chapple was born on August 6, 1868 in Salem. He graduated from Salem High School in 1887 and Boston University School of Law in 1890. He was admitted to the Essex County bar in 1890.

Political career
From 1894 to 1896, Chapple was a member of the Salem, Massachusetts Common Council. He served as council president in 1896. From 1897 to 1900 he was a member of the Massachusetts House of Representatives. From 1905 to 1908, Chapple represented the Second Essex district in the Massachusetts Senate. From 1907 to 1908 he served as Senate President. From 1915 to 1917, Chapple was Salem's city solicitor.

Death
Chapple died on May 3, 1956 at his home in Salem.

See also
 126th Massachusetts General Court (1905)
 128th Massachusetts General Court (1907)
 129th Massachusetts General Court

References

1868 births
1956 deaths
Politicians from Salem, Massachusetts
Massachusetts city council members
Massachusetts lawyers
Republican Party members of the Massachusetts House of Representatives
Republican Party Massachusetts state senators
Presidents of the Massachusetts Senate
Salem High School (Massachusetts) alumni